Mumbai Masters is a badminton team owned by Akshay Kumar and Vigish Pathak for the Premier Badminton League. The team's home ground is National Sports Club of India in Mumbai.

2016 Roaster

  H. S. Prannoy
  Gurusai Dutt
  Han Li
  Liu Zidie
  Gadde Ruthvika Shivani
  Manu Attri
  Chayut Triyachart
  Vladimir Ivanov
  Mathias Boe
  Kamilla Rytter Juhl

2013 season

The following are the fixtures for Mumbai Masters in the 2013 Indian Badminton League.

Semi final
Mumbai Masters qualified for the semi-finals of the Indian Badminton League 2013, after finishing 4th in the league table with 15 points. The semi final was against Awadhe Warriors.

Mumbai Masters were defeated in semi final and finished 3rd in the tournament alongside Pune Pistons.

References

Sport in Mumbai
Premier Badminton League teams